Tenellia henrici is a species of sea slug, an aeolid nudibranch, a marine gastropod mollusc in the family Fionidae.

Distribution
This species was described from Chilka Lake, India.

References

Fionidae
Gastropods described in 1916